USS Minneapolis–Saint Paul (SSN-708), a , was the first vessel of the United States Navy to be named for the metropolitan area of Minneapolis-Saint Paul, Minnesota, although each city had been honored twice before. The contract to build her was awarded to the Electric Boat Division of General Dynamics Corporation in Groton, Connecticut on 31 October 1973 and her keel was laid down on 20 January 1981.  She was launched on 19 March 1983 sponsored by Mrs. Penny Durenberger (wife of Senator David Durenberger), and commissioned on 10 March 1984, with Commander Ralph Schlichter in command.

While Minneapolis–Saint Paul was the first vessel named for the Twin Cities as a whole, she is the third ship to be named for Minneapolis as well as the third to be named for Saint Paul.  The previous , was the last big-gun heavy cruiser in the United States Navy, and held the distinction of having fired World War II's final (naval) shots.

History 
Minneapolis–Saint Paul took part in Operation Desert Shield and the Gulf War and was the first submarine to carry Tomahawk missiles specifically designated for use in strikes against Iraq during the Gulf War.

Four crew members were washed overboard by heavy waves on 29 December 2006 in Plymouth Sound, England, as the ship was exiting HMNB Devonport on the surface following a port call. This resulted in the deaths of Senior Chief Petty Officer Thomas Higgins (Chief of the Boat) and Sonar Technician (Submarines) 2nd Class Michael Holtz. After the preliminary investigation, Commander Edwin Ruff, the commanding officer, received a punitive letter of reprimand and was relieved of command.

Minneapolis–Saint Paul conducted inter-fleet transfer from Norfolk, Virginia, to Puget Sound Naval Shipyard, Bremerton, Washington, in July 2007 for decommissioning. Custody of Minneapolis-Saint Paul was transferred to Puget Sound Naval Shipyard in August 2008.

References 

Los Angeles-class submarines
Cold War submarines of the United States
Nuclear submarines of the United States Navy
Ships built in Groton, Connecticut
Maritime incidents in 2006
1983 ships